Kenji Maruyama (born 21 August 1965) is a Japanese former judoka. He competed in the men's half-lightweight event at the 1992 Summer Olympics.

References

External links
 

1965 births
Living people
Japanese male judoka
Olympic judoka of Japan
Judoka at the 1992 Summer Olympics
People from Nagasaki
20th-century Japanese people
21st-century Japanese people